Veglie is a town and comune in the Italian province of Lecce in the Apulia region of south-east Italy. It is bounded by the comuni of Campi Salentina, Carmiano, Leverano, Nardò, Novoli and Salice Salentino.

History

Veglie was founded around the 10th century.

Francesco Ribezzo thinks that the name Veglie comes from pre-Messapic vel, of Mediterranean origin, meaning "elevation".

A tomb found in Via Novoli in 1957 dates back to Messapic times. It is displayed in a provincial museum.

Economy

Its main industries are agriculture, which features olive and wine production and manufacturers.  Ice cream is also produced in the village.

References

Cities and towns in Apulia
Localities of Salento